The Museum of Omani Heritage is a heritage museum, located near the Ministry of Information on Al Alam Street, Muscat, Oman.

The museum opened on 17 November 1974, and has a detailed collection of archaeological objects and information including architecture, agriculture and minerals, trade routes, dhows, firearms, and art and crafts of Oman.

Former curators 

 Mouza Sulaiman Mohamed Al-Wardi

References

1974 establishments in Oman
Museums established in 1974
History museums in Oman
Museums in Muscat, Oman